Alderman Newton's Boys School  was a school in Leicester, England. It was a grammar school then became a comprehensive school.

The original school was opened in 1784, thanks to money bequeathed by a former Mayor of Leicester, Gabriel Newton. 
Land at Greyfriars, Leicester acquired by the school in 1863 later proved to be the site of the Greyfriars friary church which contained the site of the grave of King Richard III. The school building has been converted to house the King Richard III Visitor Centre.

Its pupils were known as Newtonians. They wore a uniform of green coats, which later became a Green Blazer with red piping around the cuffs and coat tails. The lower school, on the opposite side to the Cathedral and Greyfriars was where the 1st and 2nd year juniors were located. In the post war years well into the 1970s the lower school boys had to wear short grey trousers, the green school blazer and the green cap with red cords. All lower school boys had to wear the cap for fear of detention whilst walking between the lower and main school or the dinner block opposite the lower school. They also had to doff their caps to any "Masters" (teachers) whom they met along the street. The Masters mostly wore their black graduate gowns. On special occasions, such as the annual prize-giving held at the De Montfort Hall, the Masters would also wear their University stoles or colours which denoted their university of graduation. Some of these entailed quite elaborate faux fur collars. 
 
The school was closed in 1999 when it was merged by the local authority with two other local schools to form a single school. The road where the new school is located is named Greencoat Road in acknowledgement of the green coats worn by Alderman Newton's School pupils.

There is an Old Newtonians Society for ex-pupils and an Old Newtonians Rugby Football club.

Notable former pupils
A. Rupert Hall (1920–2009), historian of science
Sir Greg Knight (born 1949), conservative politician
Neil McKendrick (born 1935), historian
Harry Morley (1881–1943), artist and illustrator
Sir Edwin Nixon (1925–2008), IBM executive
Theodore Plucknett (1897–1965), academic and historian
Sir John Plumb (1911–2001), historian
Charles Percy Snow, Baron Snow (1905–1980), academic and novelist
Philip Snow (1915–2012), cricketer and colonial administrator
Trevor Storer (1930–2013), baker, founder of Pukka Pies
Eric Trapp (1910–1993), Anglican Bishop of Zululand and later of Bermuda 
Sir Alan Walters (1926–2009), economist and advisor to Margaret Thatcher
Bernard Green (1931–1998) Member of the Royal Society of Chemistry

References

External links
Alderman Newton's Schools at British History Online

Defunct schools in Leicester
1999 disestablishments in England
Educational institutions disestablished in 1999